A number of steamships have been named Indus, including:-

 , in service with Nourse Line 1866–73
Stranded and wrecked January 1883.
She sank in 1885.
 , the first steamship built for the Nourse Line, in service until captured and sunk in 1914
 , in service with Nourse Line 1940–42, sunk by German raider Thor
 , launched as Sasbeck, served with C H Abrahamsen, Stockholm as Indus from 1950–68
 , in service with Nourse Line 1954–69, when sold to Panama

For merchant vessels of the Age of Sail see: 

Ship names
hif:S.S. Indus